Bengtsfors Municipality (Bengtsfors kommun) is a municipality in Västra Götaland County in western Sweden. Its seat is located in the town of Bengtsfors.

The present municipality was formed in 1971 when the former market town (köping) of Bengtsfors (instituted in 1926) was amalgamated with the municipalities of Bäckefors, Lelång and Steneby.

Geography
The municipality has much water areas, consisting of lakes and streams. It makes it a good place for canoeing, fishing and bathing.

Every year a canoeing marathon called Dalslands Kanot Marathon+, or DKM+, is held. It is an enduring 55 km long (a marathon "plus"), stretching through the many municipal streams, and one of Sweden's largest canoeing competitions.

Bengtsfors is also crossed by the Dalsland Canal.

Localities
Localities in the municipality and inhabitants:
Bengtsfors (seat), 3,600 inh.
Billingsfors, 1,400 inh.
Bäckefors, 750 inh.
Dals Långed, 1,700 inh.
Gustavsfors, 700 inh.
Skåpafors, 400 inh.

Politics
Result of the 2010 election:
 Moderate Party 23,13%	
 Centre party 10,86%
 Liberal People's Party 5,23%	
 Christian Democrats 5,85%	
 Swedish Social Democratic Party 38,47%	
 Left Party 5,15%	
 Green Party 4,90%
 Sweden Democrats 5,65%
 Other Parties 0,78%

References

External links

Bengtsfors Municipality - Official site
Dalsland Canal - In Swedish, English and German

Municipalities of Västra Götaland County
North Älvsborg